A newspaper extra, extra edition, or special edition is a special issue of a newspaper issued outside the normal publishing schedule to report on important or sensational news which arrived too late for the regular edition, such as the outbreak of war, the assassination of a public figure, or even latest developments in a sensational trial.

It replaced the earlier broadside, a sheet printed on one side only and intended to be pasted to the walls of public places.

Starting in the mid-19th century United States, newspaper street vendors would shout "Extra! Extra! Read all about it!" when selling extras. This became a catchphrase often used to introduce events into a narrative in films.

With the development of radio, extras became obsolete in the early 1930s (in areas that had good radio coverage), replaced with breaking news bulletins.

See also

 Scoop (news)

Notes

Journalism
Newspaper publishing